Lithuania proper refers to a region that existed within the Grand Duchy of Lithuania where the Lithuanian language was spoken. The primary meaning is identical to the Duchy of Lithuania, a land around which the Grand Duchy of Lithuania evolved. The territory can be traced by Catholic Christian parishes established in pagan Baltic lands of the Grand Duchy of Lithuania subsequent to the Christianization of Lithuania in 1387. The Lithuania Proper (Lithuania Propria) was always distinguished from the Ruthenian lands since the Lithuanians differed from the Ruthenians in their language and faith (Paganism in the beginning and Catholicism since 1387). The term in Latin was widely used during the Middle Ages and can be found in numerous historical maps until World War I.

Lithuania proper sometimes is also called Lithuania Major, particularly in contrast with Lithuania Minor.

The Lithuanian geographer Kazys Pakštas wrote that Lithuania proper was known since the administrative division of the Grand Duchy of Lithuania in 1566, when the name was assigned to the palatinates of Vilnius and Trakai. The name was used in documents and maps. Lithuania proper also included the Duchy of Samogitia.

Evolution of the term

Before the Grand Duchy of Lithuania

A few Baltic confederations from the second half of the 12th century and the 13th century are known.

Historians designate Lithuania Proper (or Land of Lithuania in a narrow sense) as a Lithuanian land that existed prior to Grand Duchy of Lithuania, near other lands: Land of Nalšia, Land of Deltuva, Land of Upytė. According to Henryk Łowmiański, Lithuania Proper was in nucleus of future Trakai Voivodeship between rivers: Nemunas, Neris and Merkys. Tomas Baranauskas suggests that Lithuania Proper was around Ašmena area, ethnic Lithuanian lands in modern Belarus. According to Mikola Yermalovich (although his reliability is questioned by other scholars) Lithuania (literary: Lithuania of chronicles) was in the upper Nemunas region, now in modern Belarus.

In the Grand Duchy of Lithuania
Scholars often use term Lithuania proper to refer to lands inhabited by ethnic Lithuanians as opposed to lands controlled by the Grand Duchy of Lithuania inhabited by Ruthenians (ancestors of modern Belarusians, Ukrainians and Russians), Poles, Lithuanian Jews or many other nationalities. Already during the Grand Duchy times, Lithuania Proper was a term designated to land where Lithuanians live. Administratively it consisted of Vilnius Voivodeship, Trakai Voivodeship and the Duchy of Samogitia. This division continued even after Polish-Lithuanian Commonwealth was partitioned. Thus Grand Duchy of Lithuania was divided into such historical regions: Samogitia (literally Lower Lithuania), Lithuania Proper and Ruthenia.

Eastern part of Lithuania Propria
For centuries, eastern and southern lands of this territory, that had direct contacts with Ruthenia and Poland, initially inhabited by ethnic Lithuanians were slowly Ruthenised, Polonised and Russified, and the Lithuanian-speaking territory shrunk. Eastern parts of Lithuania Propria suffered heavy population losses during the Deluge, and further on during the Great Northern War and following plague epidemic in 1710–1711. Subsequent immigration of Ruthenians and Poles into these territories accelerated the process. A significant push to the de-Lithuanisation ensued when Lithuania became a part of the Russian Empire, and especially, after Lithuanian language books were forbidden to print in Latin letters in 1864. The process continued at the time of Polish rule, as Lithuanian language schools and libraries were closed, and later under Soviet rule, as no Lithuanian schools were in these territories at all. Many people of these territories now speaking Belarusian still refer to themselves as Lithuanians.

Modern developments
At the end of World War I, the Council of Lithuania declared an independent Lithuanian state re-established in the ethnic Lithuanian lands.

After negotiations with Bolshevik Russia a large part of Lithuania Proper was acknowledged by Soviets as part of Lithuanian Republic by signing the Soviet-Lithuanian Treaty of 1920. Some of these territories were also claimed by Second Republic of Poland. This led to series of military conflicts and eventually to war.

In 1943, Antanas Smetona (in exile at the time) began working on a study "Lithuania Propria". The book was dedicated to the history of Lithuanian lands before Polonisation, Russification, and Germanisation hoping that it would help to substantiate a claim to unreturned territories in a peace conference after World War II. His work was left unfinished, and for a long time was available only as a manuscript and was virtually unknown.

Currently the Republic of Lithuania has no territorial claims.

See also
 
 Duchy of Lithuania
 Bruno of Querfurt
 Ethnographic Lithuania
 Lithuanians in Belarus

Notes

a.

References

Sources 
 
 
 
 
 

Historical regions in Lithuania
Metropolitan or continental parts of states